The Problem Child is the third novel in The Sisters Grimm series written by Michael Buckley.

Plot summary
Sabrina is confronted by a mentally challenged girl who has kidnapped her parents (who may be the person mentioned in the title) and a vicious monster, continues to fight when Puck comes to save her (once again, he complains). Just then, the portal which Sabrina used to get to her parents burns out, and Sabrina and Puck are trapped in an old asylum. Puck and Sabrina escape, but Sabrina is injured by the monster. After her injuries heal at the hospital, Sabrina goes back with her family to Relda's house where they hold a celebration to welcome back Sabrina. That night, after investigating through many journals, the criminal becomes clear: Little Red Riding Hood.  The following night, wanting to know about Red Riding Hood, Sabrina, Daphne, and Puck go to the ruins of the asylum where she had met the Everafter child. They search for medical files in hopes of finding a clue, but a mysterious man discovers them. He seems to know Sabrina and Daphne's name, but thinking that he is part of the Scarlet Hand, the three escape back to her grandmother's house.

In the morning, Sabrina, Daphne, Relda and Puck travel to the newly built school for the opening ceremony, where Mayor Prince Charming gives a speech. However, he is distracted when the Queen of Hearts announces that she dislikes Charming's ideas and she will seek election as mayor. Suddenly, just as the chaos began, the mysterious man Sabrina had met at the ruin pops out of nowhere. He turns out to be Jacob Alexander Grimm, Relda's son and Henry's brother who gets Sabrina addicted to magic and later gets her into trouble with Baba Yaga, an ancient witch who is rumored to be a cannibal. That night, while everyone was asleep, Sabrina sneaks into the room where Jacob was sleeping, to take a look at the files in search for clues. She accidentally wakes Jacob, but instead of sending her back to bed, he explains about a few things about Red Riding Hood. The kidnapper had fallen in despair after she had lost many people that she had cared for, and thinking that her dead kitten was the ferocious monster called the Jabberwocky, she went on kidnapping other people she thought she had lost. That was how the sister's Grimm's parents were kidnapped, with Little Red Riding Hood thinking that they were her dead parents. Red Riding Hood seems evil only because of the Jabberwocky; once the Jabberwocky is killed, she is not to be feared. Sabrina discovers that the only thing that can kill the Jabberwocky is the Vorpal blade, which was divided into three pieces and distributed to separate places in Ferryport Landing. They already have the first piece. Sabrina, Daphne, and Jacob must find the remaining two.

Uncle Jake wants to take Sabrina, Daphne, and Puck out for a drive. Granny sends Sabrina to get Puck, where she finds him pouting because Granny gives more attention to Uncle Jake then him. Sabrina tells him that the whole family cares about him, he believes what she's trying to say is that she loves him and kisses her on the lips. Later during their drive, at a restaurant labeled the "Blue Plate Special" the Jabberwocky attacks and rips Puck's wings off. After two narrow escapes, they get hold of the pieces from the Little Mermaid, who is hugely fat, turning to food for comfort, after being left by an unknown "topsider". They set off searching for Baba Yaga, the cannibal witch who has the last piece of the Vorpal Blade, who asks for Merlin's Wand as an exchange. Sabrina disagrees, but Uncle Jake gives it to Baba Yaga without Sabrina's permission. As they were leaving, Sabrina stole the Shoes of Swiftness from Uncle Jake's overcoat, and went to Baba Yaga to retrieve the wand. She makes the mistake of accidentally picking up the wrong wand and holding it backwards, thus turning her into a frog (Charming had to kiss her in order to turn back into herself). Sabrina tries connecting the pieces together, and finds a puzzle on the blade, which was supposed to show who the Blue Fairy was disguised as so as she could make the sword into one whole object. The Blue Fairy turns out to be a waitress at a restaurant. After the sword is mended, Sabrina and Daphne fight the Jabberwocky and kill it. Afterwards, Uncle Jake is so addicted to magic that he attacks the Blue Fairy with the Vorpal Blade and forces her to grant him a wish. He wishes for all her power, and the fairy is forced to give it up. He uses the fairy's powers to take away the Everafters' immortal powers, which begins to kill them. He gives everyone else a wish, and Sabrina wishes that "Uncle Jake, you're smart, you've got a great family, and you're a Grimm. I wish that deep down you had always known how much power that gave you". This alters the past and changes where Uncle Jake attacks the Blue Fairy to Uncle Jake being happy with how it turned out and hugs Granny. Sabrina and Daphne then get their parents back, but they could not be woken, as far as they know of, and Puck is getting weaker.

Characters
 Sabrina Gimm
 Daphne Grimm
 Granny Relda Grimm
 Mr. Canis
 Puck
 Mirror
 Rip Van Winkle
 Mayor Charming
 Mr. Seven
 Snow White
 The Queen of Hearts
 Sheriff Nottingham 
 Sheriff Hamstead
 Uncle Jake Grimm
 Little Red Riding Hood
 The Jabberwocky
 The Little Mermaid
 Baba Yaga
 Bright Sun
 Black Midnight
 Red Dawn
 The Blue Fairy
 Veronica Grimm (asleep)
 Henry Grimm (asleep)

2006 American novels
2006 children's books
American children's novels
American fantasy novels
American mystery novels
Children's fantasy novels
Children's mystery novels
Amulet Books books